West Village Historic District may refer to:
 West Village Historic District (Princeton, Massachusetts), listed on the NRHP in Worcester County, Massachusetts
West Village Historic District (Detroit, Michigan), listed on the NRHP as West Village District
 West Village Historic District (Buffalo, New York), listed on the NRHP in Erie County, New York